Viviane Dorsile (born 1 June 1967 in Sainte Anne, Guadeloupe) is a French athlete who specialises in the 800 meters and the 4 x 400 meter relay. Dorsile competed  at the 1992 Summer Olympics and 1996 Summer Olympics.

External links
 

French female sprinters
Guadeloupean female sprinters
French female middle-distance runners
Olympic athletes of France
French people of Guadeloupean descent
Athletes (track and field) at the 1992 Summer Olympics
Athletes (track and field) at the 1996 Summer Olympics
1967 births
Living people
European Athletics Championships medalists
Mediterranean Games gold medalists for France
Mediterranean Games medalists in athletics
Athletes (track and field) at the 2001 Mediterranean Games
Olympic female sprinters
20th-century French women